The Derrones (or Deroni, Derroni) were a Thracian or a Paionian tribe. Our knowledge of them comes from coins bearing variations of the legend of DERRONIKON (ΔΕΡΡΟΝΙΚΟΝ) - DERR (ΔΕΡΡ). The letters used in the coins are Greek, although this does not prove that the Derrones spoke the same language as their southern neighbours. These coins, which were perhaps made for export as much as for internal trade, are traditionally dated to 500–450 BC.

Based on numismatic evidence, and especially coin hoards, there are two theories regarding the geographic position of the tribe.

The first theory claims that they should be placed in the central Balkans, in the northern part of North Macedonia (at the Upper Strymon valley), while the second theory considers that this tribe, at least at the time of the striking of the inscribed coins (i.e. early 5th century), was based in an area further to the south.

Notes

References 
- SVORONOS J.N., "L’Hellénisme primitif de la Macédoine prouve par la Numismatique et l’or du Pangée", JIAN 19 (1919).

- HAMMOND N.G.L., GRIFFITH G.T., A History of Macedonia II, Oxford 1979.

- PETROVA Eleonora, "The coinage of the Paeonian Tribal Organisations and Paeonian Kings (VI to III Centuries B.C.), Coins and mints in Macedonia": in Proceedings of the symposium held in honor of the 80th birthday and 50th anniversary of the scholarly and educational work of Ksente Bogoev, member of the Macedonian Academy of Arts and Sciences / [Cvetan Grozdanov, editor; translated by Elizabeta Bakovska, Katerina Hristovska]. Skopje: Macedonian Academy of Arts and Sciences: National Bank of the Republic of Macedonia, 2001, pp. 13–27

- TZAMALIS Alexandros R.A., “The Coins of the Derronians. Examination of the Circulation through the Coin Hoards", Themelion.24 papers in Honor of Professor Petros Themelis from his students and colleagues, Athens 2013

Ancient tribes in Macedonia
Ancient tribes in North Macedonia
Paeonian tribes
Thracian tribes